Bobby Williamson (6 December 1933 – 22 August 1990) was a Scottish footballer, who played for Stenhousemuir, Arbroath, St Mirren, Barnsley, Leeds United, Rochdale and Chorley.

References

1933 births
1990 deaths
Footballers from Edinburgh
Association football goalkeepers
Scottish footballers
Stenhousemuir F.C. players
Arbroath F.C. players
St Mirren F.C. players
Barnsley F.C. players
Leeds United F.C. players
Rochdale A.F.C. players
Chorley F.C. players
Scottish Football League players
English Football League players